Backtrack is a 2015 mystery thriller horror film written, co-produced, and directed by Michael Petroni. The film stars Adrien Brody, Bruce Spence, Sam Neill, Robin McLeavy, Malcolm Kennard, and Jenni Baird.

Plot
Troubled psychotherapist Peter Bower suffers from nightmares and eerie visions ever since the death of his daughter Evie in a street accident a year earlier, which he blames himself for after he was briefly distracted by something in a store window and failed to notice her veer off the sidewalk. His wife Carol suffers extreme depression and rarely gets out of bed while he works in his practice, meeting some clients referred to him by his mentor, Duncan. One client, Felix, apparently suffers from anterograde amnesia, believing that it is still the 80s; another, Erica, talks of her suicidal thoughts, but finds herself unable to commit suicide; and another, Elizabeth Valentine, is a girl who is apparently mute and who reacts with fear to the sound of the train passing by Peter's office, and before she flees, she writes a series of numbers on one of Peter's notepads: 12787.

Elizabeth returns unexpectedly, and Peter finds her looking out of his window to where the train will pass. Again, she is disturbed by the sound of it and begins to choke; she hits the window, leaving a handprint. Peter records her, but she disappears before he can speak to her further. He plays the recording to Duncan, who claims he hears nothing and believes that Peter is hallucinating Elizabeth out of guilt from failing to prevent his daughter's death, pointing out that her initials sound like Evie's name. Later, Peter hallucinates Elizabeth saying that "we have her" before turning into Evie and then vanishing, and later, he has a nightmare about Erica, who says she wasn't able to commit suicide because she's already dead. Doing research, Peter discovers that Elizabeth died in 1987, along with all the other clients who have been seeing him. The numbers that Elizabeth wrote on his notepad was a date: July 12, 1987. Perplexed, he calls Duncan and asks to speak with him later, and then has a vision of his deceased patients on the train outside of his window.

Duncan comes over, and Peter worries about his sanity and questions how Duncan could have referred the patients when all of them have been deceased for decades. He then notices that Duncan doesn't appear in a mirror, and he, too, is a ghost. Now fully disturbed, Peter uses a map to discover that all the deceased patients lived along a train line leading to his hometown, False Creek. He travels there alone and meets with his father, William, a retired cop. Going to the bar, Peter meets with a childhood friend, Barry, and tells him that there is a weight on his conscience that he wants lifted. Barry alludes to a horrifying event that happened in their youth that they promised to keep a secret, and tells Peter to leave him out of any confession.

When the two were teenagers, Barry led Peter to a secret location that his brother mentioned, where couples would apparently have sex in their cars. The two left their bikes at the side of the train tracks and went to go spy on a couple in a car. Peter panics when he hears a train whistle, and he raced to move their bikes; in the process, he saw what he thought was Barry, running ahead of him. However, neither got there in time, and the train was violently derailed, killing 47 of the passengers on board. Peter saw several of the victims, all of whom would be his deceased future clients. He is then terrorized by the ghosts of Evie, Felix, and Elizabeth.

The next morning, Barry drives to the train tracks, and Peter goes to the police station. There, he meets Barbara, a constable, and confesses the incident to her. She tells him that he will likely face no charges, as it was an accident that happened when he was a teenager, and the statute of limitations has expired. Peter also discovers that she was the daughter of Erica. He apologizes, and Barbara tells him that her mother was the only local killed in the accident, and that William was kind to her at the funeral, inspiring her to become a police officer.

Barbara investigates the accident while Peter tries and fails to burn his newspaper clipping of the accident. He is drawn to a closet, where the ghost of Elizabeth briefly strangles him. Duncan then appears, telling him that there was no way that bicycles lying against the tracks would have derailed the train, and that there was more to the accident. He also urges Peter to remember exactly what distracted him on the day of Evie's death. Peter recalls looking into a toy shop window at a railroad set, specifically, a model of a switch tower. The next morning, he investigates the switch tower beside the tracks and finds Barry, who has committed suicide, inside. When the police arrive, Peter confesses to Barbara that Barry was there the night of the accident, but he intentionally left him out of the confession. Later, he tells her about his hallucinations since Evie's death. When she does not believe him, he tells her details about Erica that he wouldn't otherwise know. Rattled, she orders him to leave.

A police officer finds an old and encrusted pin lying on the floor of the switch house and gives it to Barbara, who discovers that it's the insignia of Elizabeth's high school. As Peter once more returns to the scene of the accident, she pays a visit to William and tells him that during her investigation, she has discovered that the road he apparently drove to get to the aftermath of the crash was blocked off, and he would have only been able to drive there if his car had already been on the right side of the tracks, as the crossing was blocked by the derailment. Furthermore, Elizabeth was the only victim with a cause of death that the coroners deemed inconclusive. Meanwhile, Peter sees Elizabeth's ghost once more, and, taking the same path he did as the night of the accident, he realizes that it was not Barry he saw running ahead of him, but Elizabeth. Going up to the switch house, he suddenly remembers all of the night: he looked through the windows of the house to see his father (William) strangling Elizabeth. In her struggle to survive, she left a handprint on the window (the same one he saw earlier), and she also accidentally pulled the lever of the track points, leading it to derail and kill the passengers. Afterwards, William placed her body at the scene of the crash inside a derailed carriage.

Barbara asserts to William that she knows Elizabeth was not a victim of the crash, and she believes that Peter saw something that night that William wanted covered up. William knocks her unconscious and puts her in the trunk of her police car. Peter returns and tells William that he knows the truth: the couple that Peter and Barry saw in the car was really William raping Elizabeth, and he saw William kill her; he asks William if Elizabeth was his only victim. William pulls a gun on him and tells him to get in the police car in the garage. Inside, Peter hears Barbara regain consciousness while in the car boot, and after a brief struggle, William knocks him unconscious as well.

The next morning, William drives out with both Peter and Barbara restrained in the car. A gun is on the passenger seat. However, the ghost of Elizabeth appears in the road and in the car, startling William and making him lose control of the car. In the process, Peter is thrown out of the backseat of the car and ends up a safe distance away, with the gun. William ends up on the train tracks, the engine dead and the doors locked as a train begins to approach. He tries and fails to escape and yells to Peter for help. Peter attempts to shoot out a window so William can escape, but only succeeds when the train is extremely close. The trunk opens and Barbara manages to climb out, and Peter pushes her off the tracks to safety. William, held back by Elizabeth's ghost, is crushed by the train. As Peter and Barbara stand on the side of the tracks, Peter can see the ghosts of the victims on the train, and sees a tranquil Elizabeth turn and depart.

Later, Peter is on the beach with the ghost of Evie, who gets up and walks into the ocean, finally moving on and at peace. His wife joins him and asks what he's thinking about; Peter tells her that he's thinking about kids. Carol smiles, and they embrace.

Cast
Adrien Brody as Peter Bower
Bruce Spence as Felix
Sam Neill as Duncan Stewart
Robin McLeavy as Barbara Henning
Malcolm Kennard as Barry
Jenni Baird as Carol Bower
Anna Lise Phillips as Erica George
Chloe Bayliss as Elizabeth Valentine
Emma O'Farrell as Evie Bower
Matthew Sunderland as Steve
George Shevtsov as William Bower

Release
The film premiered on 18 April 2015 at the Tribeca Film Festival. On 24 April 2015 Saban Films acquired distribution rights to the film.

Reception
On review aggregator website Rotten Tomatoes, the film has a rating of 30% based on 40 reviews and an average rating of 4.48/10. The site's consensus reads: "Adrien Brody remains a compelling presence, but those contemplating a screening of this muddled paranormal thriller are advised to Backtrack immediately." On Metacritic, the film has a score of 43 out of 100 based on 10 critics, indicating "mixed or average reviews".

References

External links

2015 films
2010s mystery thriller films
2015 psychological thriller films
Australian mystery thriller films
British psychological thriller films
Emirati mystery films
Emirati thriller films
English-language Emirati films
Films directed by Michael Petroni
Films shot in Sydney
Films with screenplays by Michael Petroni
Saban Films films
Films about rape
Films about child sexual abuse
2010s English-language films
2010s British films